Punch Trunk is a 1953 Warner Bros. Looney Tunes cartoon written by Mike Maltese and directed by Chuck Jones. The short was released on December 19, 1953.

Plot
The short begins with a narrator (voiced by an uncredited Robert C. Bruce) who introduces a 5 inch tall dwarf elephant. Its huge roar causes a dock worker next to the S.S. Michael Maltese to faint. In the next scene, the elephant is hogging the bird bath in a yard. The owner of the house phones the police about it, but is merely taken to a mental hospital because they believe that he is crazy.

Next, a woman hanging up the laundry in another yard is handed clothes pins by the elephant. When she notices, she screams in horror and runs inside, taking refuge in a washer.

Next, a man exits an optometry clinic with new glasses, but when he sees the tiny elephant, he marches back inside, punches the optometrist, and leaves, because he thought the doctor made him see things that aren't there.

Next, in a high rise apartment, a mother is informed by her daughter that an elephant is in her room. The skeptical mother puts her back to bed. Later, the daughter is bringing a piece of cake to the elephant. This time, the mother goes into her room to look in the dollhouse. When the tiny elephant roars at her, the mother faints in shock.

Later, a drunk man leaves a bar, and sees the tiny elephant (who gets the man's attention by roaring). He checks his watch and then simply says: "You're late." As he wanders off, he mutters to himself: "He always used to be pink!"

After that, a line of elephants at a circus includes the tiny elephant, which freaks out one of the other elephants. A cat chases a mouse under a tent, only to grab the tiny elephant instead. When it roars, the cat turns into a monkey.

Later, at a psychiatrist's office, a woman is talking about her life and when the psychiatrist sees the tiny elephant (who had just drank all the water from his drinking glass), he switches places with the woman.

Then, the cartoon cuts to a man painting a flag pole.  A crowd is watching below. The elephant approaches and roars, causing the spectators to join the flag pole painter.

After this, various newspaper headlines describe the panic in the city: "Mass hallucination grips city", "Hundreds Claim to Have Seen Tiny Elephant", "I Seen It.", "Picayune Pachyderm Panics Populace", "Noted Scientist to Take to Air to Calm Alarmed Citizenry".

The last headline leads into the final set piece:  Robert Bruce Cameron, said scientist, says the elephant is just a figment of everyone's imagination. The tiny elephant walks into view, moving the microphone from the oblivious scientist as he reads his statement to the moderator who is petrified at the bizarre sight. The moderator says that Cameron's views don't necessarily represent the views of the station, and faints. The tiny elephant roars as the cartoon ends. (The moderator is named "Mr. Pratt", a nod to Warner Bros. layout artist Hawley Pratt, who would go on to create the Pink Panther character for DePatie–Freleng Enterprises).

Legacy
The tiny elephant makes a cameo in 1959's Unnatural History.

The cartoon was edited into Daffy Duck's Quackbusters. Here, it begins from the bird bath scene and leaves out the scenes in the high-rise apartment, the circus scene, the cat, and the flagpole. Also the newspaper headlines had swapped round so they are shown in this order; "Mass Hallucination Grips City", "Picayune Pachyderm Panics Populace", "Hundreds Claim To Have Seen Tiny Elephant" and "I Seen It". The last headline had been changed from "Noted Scientist to Take to Air to Calm Alarmed Citizenry" to "Sightings of Tiny Elephant Continue" to tie in with the story; Daffy Duck, having read about the mass panic through the last headline, was interviewed on Frightline with Zed Toppel and dismissed the elephant sighting as mere nonsense, but was then left publicly disgraced when the elephant walked past his desk (Daffy halfway noticing the elephant before it roared at him).

Home media
This short is a bonus feature on disc 4 of Looney Tunes Golden Collection: Volume 6.

References

External links
 
 

1953 films
1953 animated films
1953 short films
Looney Tunes shorts
Warner Bros. Cartoons animated short films
Short films directed by Chuck Jones
1950s Warner Bros. animated short films
Films scored by Carl Stalling
Films with screenplays by Michael Maltese
Animated films about elephants
1950s English-language films